Jesus and the Samaritan Woman is a 1742 painting by Jean-François de Troy of the Samaritan woman at the well. It is one of a series of six paintings by the artist for Pierre Guérin de Tencin and his archepiscopal palace at Lyon - the others were The Death of Lucretia, The Death of Cleopatra, The Judgement of Solomon, The Idolatry of Solomon and The Woman Caught in Adultery. It is now at the Museum of Fine Arts of Lyon.

References

Bibliography
 M.F. Amigues-de Uffrédi, S. Charret-Berthon et M.F. Pérez (dir.), Tableaux français du xviie et du xviiie siècles au musée des Beaux-Arts de Lyon : mémoire de maîtrise d’histoire de l’art dans l’université Lumière, avril 1989.

Paintings depicting Jesus
1742 paintings
Paintings by Jean-François de Troy
Paintings in the collection of the Museum of Fine Arts of Lyon